Emilio E. Huyke Colón (February 28, 1912 – December, 1983) was a Puerto Rican writer, boxing television broadcaster and sports enthusiast. He was a sports administrator in the Caribbean, as the head of various sports organizations in the Caribbean area. He is a member of the Puerto Rican Sports Hall of Fame.

In Puerto Rico, Huyke is known as the "father of basketball" (in that nation).

Legacy 
The Emilio E. Huyke Coliseum in Humacao is named after him.

In addition, there is a school named after him in San Juan.

See also 
List of Puerto Ricans

References 

1912 births
1983 deaths
People from Humacao, Puerto Rico
People from San Juan, Puerto Rico
Puerto Rican people of Italian descent
Puerto Rican writers
Boxing commentators
Puerto Rican people of German descent